Tyson Etienne (born September 17, 1999) is an American professional basketball player for the College Park Skyhawks of the NBA G League. He played college basketball for the Wichita State Shockers.

High school career
Etienne began playing high school basketball as a freshman at Dwight-Englewood School in Englewood, New Jersey. For his junior season, he transferred to Long Island Lutheran Middle and High School in Brookville, New York. As a junior, Etienne averaged 16.5 points and 3.4 assists per game. He competed alongside Cole Anthony with the PSA Cardinals Amateur Athletic Union program. He played for Putnam Science Academy in Putnam, Connecticut for a postgraduate year, helping his team reach the National Prep Championship semifinals. After high school, Etienne worked with NBA trainer Chris Brickley and trained with several NBA players. A four-star recruit, he committed to playing college basketball for Wichita State over offers from Oklahoma, VCU, Seton Hall, Auburn, Minnesota and St. John's.

College career
On November 16, 2019, Etienne scored a freshman season-high 21 points, shooting 5-of-8 from three-point range, in a 103–62 win over UT Martin. As a freshman, he averaged 9.4 points and shot 38.8 percent from the three-point line. In the offseason, Etienne improved his athleticism and strength. On January 2, 2021, he scored 29 points in an 83–79 win over Ole Miss. As a sophomore, Etienne averaged 16.3 points, 3.4 rebounds, 2.5 assists, and 1.0 steals per game, earning AAC co-Player of the Year honors. Following the season, he declared for the 2021 NBA draft, but ultimately returned to Wichita State. In his junior season, Etienne averaged 14.9 points, 2.9 rebounds, 2.0 assists, and 1.1 steals per game, earning a selection to the Third Team All-AAC. On April 21, 2022, he declared for the 2022 NBA draft while foregoing his remaining college eligibility.

Professional career

College Park Skyhawks (2022–present)
Etienne went undrafted in the 2022 NBA Draft. On November 4, 2022, Etienne was named to the opening night roster for the College Park Skyhawks.

Career statistics

College

|-
| style="text-align:left;"| 2019–20
| style="text-align:left;"| Wichita State
| 31 || 17 || 24.6 || .376 || .388 || .800 || 2.1 || 1.4 || 1.2 || .1 || 9.4
|-
| style="text-align:left;"| 2020–21
| style="text-align:left;"| Wichita State
| 22 || 22 || 33.8 || .371 || .392 || .757 || 3.4 || 2.5 || 1.0 || .1 || 16.3
|- 
| style="text-align:left;"| 2021–22
| style="text-align:left;"| Wichita State
| 27 || 26 || 34.3 || .359 || .326 || .768 || 2.9 || 2.0 || 1.1 || .0 || 14.9
|- class="sortbottom"
| style="text-align:center;" colspan="2"| Career
| 80 || 65 || 30.4 || .367 || .364 || .772 || 2.7 || 1.9 || 1.1 || .1 || 13.2

Personal life
His father, Max Etienne, played college basketball for Maryland. His mother, Anita Gibson, is an Emmy-nominated make-up artist. Etienne is a nephew of former NBA player Marcus Camby and actor Omari Hardwick. He is a cousin of NBA player DeAndre Jordan. Etienne's childhood friend Armoni Sexton was shot and killed in 2015, and Etienne plays basketball to honor him.

References

External links
Wichita State Shockers bio

1999 births
Living people
American men's basketball players
Basketball players from New Jersey
Dwight-Englewood School alumni
People from Englewood, New Jersey
Point guards
Shooting guards
Sportspeople from Bergen County, New Jersey
Wichita State Shockers men's basketball players